Ahoskie Historic District is a national historic district located at Ahoskie, Hertford County, North Carolina.  The district encompasses 604 contributing buildings, 1 contributing site, and 2 contributing structures in the central business district and surrounding residential sections of Ahoskie. The buildings include notable examples of Classical Revival, Colonial Revival, Late Gothic Revival, Tudor Revival, and Bungalow / American Craftsman architecture.  The district includes the separately listed Ahoskie School and Roberts H. Jernigan House and encompasses the previously listed Ahoskie Downtown Historic District. Other notable buildings include The Tomahawk Motel (c. 1959-1960), Ahoskie Food Center (c. 1953), Thomas Wright Hayes House (c. 1805, c. 1850, c. 1948), Basnight & Company Building (c. 1931), Ahoskie United Methodist Church (c. 1927), St. Thomas Episcopal Church (1931, c. 1955, c. 1993), and North Carolina Mutual Insurance Company (c. 1920).

It was listed on the National Register of Historic Places in 2012.

References

Historic districts on the National Register of Historic Places in North Carolina
Colonial Revival architecture in North Carolina
Neoclassical architecture in North Carolina
Tudor Revival architecture in North Carolina
Gothic Revival architecture in North Carolina
Buildings and structures in Hertford County, North Carolina
National Register of Historic Places in Hertford County, North Carolina